Morpheis cognata is a moth in the family Cossidae. It was described by Francis Walker in 1856. It is found in Mexico and Honduras.

References

Zeuzerinae
Moths described in 1856